The Turkvision Song Contest 2016 would have been the fourth edition of the Turkvision Song Contest, and was scheduled to take place at the Yahya Kemal Beyatli Cultural Centre, in Istanbul, Turkey, and organised by TMB TV and Azad Azerbaijan TV.

Twenty-six Turkic regions, which have either a large Turkic population or a widely spoken Turkic language, had confirmed their participation in the contest.

In February 2017, two months after the contest was supposed to air, it was announced as being cancelled, and Kazakhstan were announced as the hosts for the Turkvision Song Contest 2017 in Astana. The 2017 contest was also cancelled, and the contest was not held again until .

Location

In May 2016 it was announced by Subhane Isgenderova, the Azerbaijan Head of Delegation, that Antalya was going to be the host city for the fourth edition of the contest. However, on 11 July 2016, it was later confirmed that the announcement made Isgenderova was in fact incorrect, and the official host city would be Istanbul.

Venue

Had the 2016 contest gone ahead as scheduled the venue would have been for the second consecutive year, the Yahya Kemal Beyatli Cultural Centre, which has 10,000 covered seats of 30,000 seats at total in Küçükçekmece district of Istanbul.

Format

National host broadcaster
On 15 July 2016 it was confirmed that Turkish Music Box Television (TMB TV) would have been the host broadcaster for the second consecutive year, which would have been responsible for the organisation of the contest.

Cancellation
On 8 December 2016, it was announced that the contest had been delayed until March 2017, marking the first time since the inaugural contest in 2013 that a postponement of the contest had occurred. However, it was later confirmed that the 2016 contest had been cancelled for unknown reasons. The contest was rescheduled to take place between 8–10 September 2017 at the Barys Arena, in Astana, Kazakhstan, but was cancelled again on 20 October.

Provisional list of participants
Twenty-six Turkic regions, which have either a large Turkic population or a widely spoken Turkic language, had confirmed their participation in the contest, fifteen of which had selected their artist (nine of those having also chosen their song). Shir Charyev was announced as participating, although details as to which country he would have represented had not been disclosed.

Other Turkic regions
 – On 23 September 2016 Hayat TV, broadcaster of Bosnia and Herzegovina at Turkvision, said that they were still undecided about their participation in the 2016 contest.

 – On 25 November 2016 it was announced that Khakassia would not participate in the 2016 contest. Despite this they did select their artist, Irenek Khan.

See also

 ABU Radio Song Festival 2016
 ABU TV Song Festival 2016
 Bala Turkvision Song Contest 2016
 Eurovision Song Contest 2016
 Eurovision Young Musicians 2016
 Junior Eurovision Song Contest 2016

References

External links
 
 

2016 in Turkey
Turkish music
Turkvision Song Contest by year
2016 song contests
Cancelled music festivals